Lourdes Roldán (born 27 June 1944) is a Mexican fencer. She competed in the women's individual and team foil events at the 1968 Summer Olympics.

References

External links
 

1944 births
Living people
Mexican female foil fencers
Olympic fencers of Mexico
Fencers at the 1968 Summer Olympics
Fencers from Mexico City
Pan American Games medalists in fencing
Pan American Games bronze medalists for Mexico
Fencers at the 1991 Pan American Games
20th-century Mexican women
21st-century Mexican women